Adela septentrionella is a moth of the  family Adelidae or fairy longhorn moths. It was described by Walsingham in 1880. It is widespread from southern British Columbia and north-western Idaho to the Transverse Range in southern California.

The length of the forewings is 4.5–5.7 mm. The forewings are purplish-black with two incomplete thin white bands. The antennae of the males are at least twice as long as the wings. The hindwings are uniformly dark. Adults are on wing from mid April to mid July.

The larvae feed on buds of Holodiscus discolor. Full-grown larvae overwinter in cases on the ground. Pupation takes place in late March or April.

MATING SYSTEM OBSERVATIONS, Dr. Paul J. Watson, Flathead Lake Biological Station
Adela septentrionella? I am studying the mating system of this Adela sp. at Flathead Lake Biological Station. Males engage in combat using long tibial spurs during flight displays and while landed on leaves immediately below. They clearly are trying to fray one another's wings and also kill rivals. Swarms of 2-6 males occur at the same sites season after season. On my study site, displays occur above Ninebark (Physocarpus malvaceus) leaves while shrubs are in full bloom; males and females drink the nectar. Females, with orange hairdo and shorter antennas, watch male displays, often upwind, from 15 – 20 feet away. Females may be releasing a pheromone that tells males they are being watched and that intensifies male-male combat. Females eventually fly into the male swarm and engage in evasive flight; the least damaged male would be the most likely to capture her. Orange hair helps keep them from being slashed, I hypothesize. Mating occurs below the mating swarm, in plain view, without interference. Fertilized females fight over the most sun-exposed Ocean Spray (Holodiscus discolor) unopened flower inflorescences for oviposition. Traditional display sites have both these shrubs growing contiguously. My observations might be on a slightly disjunct Adela septentrionella population, or that of a subspecies? In spite of much local searching, I have never seen them anywhere except the Biological Station. I have posted four photos, two of males and two of females, in the Wikimedia Commons.

References

Adelidae
Moths described in 1880
Moths of North America